Neligh Township is one of sixteen townships in Cuming County, Nebraska, United States. The population was 180 at the 2020 census. A 2021 estimate placed the township's population at 178.

See also
County government in Nebraska

References

External links
City-Data.com

Townships in Cuming County, Nebraska
Townships in Nebraska